Kadılar may refer to:

 Kadılar, Çan
 Kadılar, Çine
 Kadılar, Dinar
 Kadılar, Manavgat
 Kadılar, Mengen